Thanasis Karagounis (Greek: Θανάσης Καραγκούνης; born 25 September 1991) is a Greek professional footballer who plays as a winger or an attacking midfielder for Super League 2 club Proodeftiki.

Club career

Fokikos
Karagounis started his professional career in 2008 with Fokikos, making 30 appearances in the Football League 2 and scoring 4 goals.

Atromitos
In summer 2009 he joined the newly promoted Beta Ethniki champions Atromitos,.

He was part of the Atromitos team who were runners-up of the 2010–11 Greek Cup, after losing 0–3 to AEK Athens. Thanasis only made 2 appearances in Atromitos' way to the final, one as a starter against Anagennisi Giannitsa for the fourth phase and one as a substitute against Diagoras for the second leg of the quarter finals. He scored his first goal with the club on 3 May 2014 in an away loss 2–1 against Twente.

Zwolle
In January 2014, he signed a 2.5-year contract with PEC Zwolle for a transfer fee of €300,000. He made his debut with the club in January, 18th as a substitute in a 1–2 home loss against Vitesse Arnhem. Karagounis injured on his lip during the Dutch cup match between PEC Zwolle and NEC Nijmegen at the IJsseldelta stadium on 26 March 2014 in Zwolle. On 25 November 2014, Karagounis injured again suffering a cruciate ligament rupture losing the rest of the 2014–15 season.

In July 2015, after a very difficult year for the defender marred by injury (185 days to be exact), according to Voetbal International, Karagounis' return was postponed when there was a setback during his rehabilitation from a cruciate ligament injury. It remained a question whether there is a need for another operation. Eventually he lost the whole season and returned to the squad on 30 June 2016.

In April 2016, PEC Zwolle renewed Karagounis' contract for two seasons, till the summer of 2018, despite his severe injury that kept him out of action for the whole season. There is also an option included in his contract for one more season.

After a very difficult year for the midfielder marred by injury (363 days to be exact), Karagounis returned to action in a 4–1 away win game against DVS '33 for the 2016–17 KNVB Cup. On 2 October 2016, he made his reappearance in the championship as a late substitute in a 2–1 home win against ADO Den Haag. On 17 February 2017, he suffered a new knee injury, a second during the 2016–17 season, and the medical predictions estimate his return to action in six months.

In the beginning of 2017–18 season after a third difficult season marred by injury (219 days to be exact), PEC Zwolle announced Karagounis that he could continue his career elsewhere as his not in the plans of club's coach John van 't Schip, besides the fact that his contract is still in force. According to Dutch websites the player will probably sign a contract with Ekstraklasa club Korona Kielce in the January transfer window, but the transfer was not completed and the Greek midfielder is still searching for the next club in his career.

Lamia
On 3 July 2018, Lamia announced the signing of the Greek midfielder for an undisclosed fee.

Apollon Smyrnis
On 14 August 2019, Apollon Smyrnis announced the signing of the Greek midfielder for an undisclosed fee.

International career
Thanasis Karagounis made 7 appearances for Greece under-19 in the past. He is currently a member of the under-21 team, making 9 appearances for them so far.

Personal life
His brother, Vasilis, is also a professional footballer, who is currently playing for Cypriot club Ermis Aradippou FC.
Although he shares the same surname as Giorgos Karagounis, the former captain of the Greece national football team, it was revealed at a joint interview of both players that they are not related.

Career statistics

Club

Honours
Zwolle
KNVB Cup: 2013–14
Johan Cruijff Shield: 2014

References

External links
 
 Voetbal International profile 

1991 births
Living people
Association football wingers
Association football midfielders
Greek footballers
Greece under-21 international footballers
Greece youth international footballers
Greek expatriate footballers
Super League Greece players
Super League Greece 2 players
Fokikos A.C. players
Atromitos F.C. players
PAS Lamia 1964 players
Apollon Smyrnis F.C. players
Eredivisie players
PEC Zwolle players
Expatriate footballers in the Netherlands
Footballers from Lamia (city)
21st-century Greek people